Rudolph James (born 19 July 1945) is a Guyanese weightlifter. He competed in the men's light heavyweight event at the 1968 Summer Olympics.

References

1945 births
Living people
Guyanese male weightlifters
Olympic weightlifters of Guyana
Weightlifters at the 1968 Summer Olympics
Place of birth missing (living people)
20th-century Guyanese people